MAK may refer to:

Places 
 Malakal Airport IATA code
 Interstate Aviation Committee, also known as MAK
 MaK Motoren GmbH, German division of Caterpillar Inc. with headquarters in Hamburg
 Makerere University (MAK), a Uganda's largest and second-oldest higher institution of learning
 MAK Historic District (Decatur), the first locally designated historic district in Decatur, Georgia
 Museum für angewandte Kunst Frankfurt, Museum of Applied Arts, Frankfurt
 Museum für angewandte Kunst Wien, Museum of Applied Arts, Vienna

People 
 M. A. Khan (1920–2001), Indian politician
 Maha Ali Kazmi, Pakistani singer-songwriter
 Mahafarid Amir Khosravi (1969–2014), Iranian businessman
 Mahboob Ali Khan (1866–1911), 6th Nizam of Hyderabad
 Mahmood Ahmad Khan, Pakistani politician
 Mahmoud Abdel Khalek (born 1938), Lebanese politician
 Maimul Ahsan Khan (born 1954), Bangladeshi scholar
 Mairaj Ahmad Khan (born 1975)
 Makhdoom Ali Khan (born 1954), practising Senior Advocate Supreme Court
 Malak Azmat Khan, Pakistani politician
 Malik Ahmad Khan (born 1971), Pakistani politician
 Malik Aitbar Khan (born 1953), Pakistani politician
 Malik Alaudin Khan, the Jagirdar of Tijara
 Malik Allahyar Khan (1927–2008), parliamentarian from Pakistan
 Mansur Ali Khan (disambiguation), several
 Manzoor Ahmed Kakar (born 1971), Pakistani politician
 Manzoor Ali Khan (1922–1980), Sindhi classical singer
 Mar Aprim Khamis, Assyrian Church of the East bishop
 Marcus A. Kemp (1878–1957), American politician
 Margaret Anderson Kelliher (born 1968), American politician
 Maria Araújo Kahn, American judge
 Mario Alberto Kempes (born 1954), Argentinian footballer

Organizations 
 MAK Technologies, Inc., a software company
 Maktab al-Khidamat, the forerunner to al-Qaeda
 Maschinenbau Kiel, German industrial company now part of Vossloh; made railway locomotives
 MAT Macedonian Airlines, former national flag carrier airline of the Republic of Macedonia
 Mongolyn Alt Corporation, a Mongolian mining company
 Movement for the Autonomy of Kabylie, a political organization in Algeria

Technology 
 Media Access Key, used by TiVo digital video recorders
 Multiple Activation Key, or Volume license key (VLK), a type of activation key for Microsoft products

Other uses 
 Male germ cell-associated kinase, a human protein
 Maschinen Krieger (Ma. K ZBV3000), a science fiction universe created by Japanese artist and sculptor Kow Yokoyama
 Maximale Arbeitsplatz-Konzentration, a German expression corresponding to threshold limit value, which relates to safe daily exposure levels to chemical substances

See also

 
 
 Mak (disambiguation)
 MAKS (disambiguation)